Jacob Toppel Schoop (born 23 December 1988) is a Danish professional footballer who plays as a midfielder for FC Helsingør in the Danish 1st Division.

Club career 
Schoop began his career with lower league Odense sides Tarup-Paarup and B1909, before switching to FC Fyn in January 2008 after having a strong debut season for the B1909 first team in the Denmark Series. As a youth, Schoop had been offered a three-year contract with a team in the United States, but had turned it down in order to finish his education in Denmark.

In the summer of 2011, Schoop moved to Odense Boldklub (OB) from FC Fyn. He made nine appearances in the spring of 2012.

On 14 April 2015, Schoop signed for Icelandic side KR Reykjavík.

In July 2016, Schoop moved to Vejle Boldklub. Before the 2017–18 season, coach Adolfo Sormani named Schoop the captain of Vejle Boldklub. On 27 January 2022, Schoop made a surprising move to Danish 1st Division club FC Helsingør, where he signed a deal until June 2023.

References

External links 
 Official Danish league stats at danskfodbold.com 
 

1988 births
Place of birth missing (living people)
Living people
Danish men's footballers
Tarup-Paarup IF players
FC Fyn players
Odense Boldklub players
Knattspyrnufélag Reykjavíkur players
Vejle Boldklub players
FC Helsingør players
Danish Superliga players
Danish 1st Division players
Danish 2nd Division players
Úrvalsdeild karla (football) players
Danish expatriate men's footballers
Expatriate footballers in Iceland
Danish expatriate sportspeople in Iceland
Association football midfielders
Footballers from Odense